Miss Trans Israel is a beauty pageant for transgender people. It was first held in 2016 in Tel Aviv, when it was won by Talleen Abu Hanna. She represented the nation of Israel in the Miss Trans Star International beauty pageant, that was held in the city of Barcelona in 2016.

Miss Trans Israel 2016 
Miss Trans Israel Pageant was held on May 27, 2016 at Habima National Theater in Tel Aviv, Israel. Eleven contestants from a variety of religious and ethnic backgrounds competed for the title of the first ever Miss Trans Israel 2016.

Auditions 
On March 3, 2016 three rounds of auditions were held at the Theater Club in Jaffa for the 35 Trans women who wished to compete. Out of the nineteen participants who came to the auditions, eleven finalists were selected to compete in the final beauty pageant.

Pageant 
To mark the beginning of pride week in Tel aviv, organizers and activists at the LGBT center produced for the first time in history, the Miss Trans Israel pageant held at Habima National Theatre. The prize was $15,000 worth of plastic surgery procedures at the Kamol Cosmetic Hospital in Bangkok, Thailand, including airfare and hotel accommodation, and donated by Dr. Kamol and Kamol hospital team. The event received international attention, with articles and videos in online newspapers such as CBS, NBC, The New York Times, Boston Herald, Business Insider, Time magazine, Jerusalem Post, Haaretz, The Times of India, and Spanish El Mundo. Contestants were asked to model a swimwear look, a casual dress, and a bridal gown, in addition to being asked questions about their fashion style.

Production team 
 Executive Director: Israela Stephanie Lev
 Producer: Shenhav Levy
 Director of LGBT Center: Yuval Egart
 Public Relations: Hanita Lev Ari 
 Show Director: Segev Gershon
 Visual Media: Koby Ben Shoshan
 Lighting: Noa Elran
 Photographer: Eitan Tal
 Artistic Review: Ilan Peled, Noya Aviv, and Sharon Haziz
 Music: Yoav Arnon
 Graphic Designer: Guy Kaminer
 Styling: Gili Algabi
 Costumes: Julie Vino
 Make Up: Miki Buganim Academy 
 Hair: Davis and Udi Academy
 Hosts: Gal Uchovsky and Sharon Haziz
 Choreographer: Shay Susanna

Panel of judges 
 Efrat Tilma
 Betty Rockaway
 Shenhav Levy
 Nicol Raidman
 Vanessa Lopez
 Ronan Ackerman

Guests of honor 
 Judy Nirmoses Shalom
 Gadi Bar Lavi
 Jesper Vahr, Denmark's ambassador to Israel
 Gila Goldstein

Contestants 
In a press release issued by the organizers and producers of the pageant, contestants were described as constituting "a true Israeli mosaic. With different backgrounds, communities, and faiths, they are an example of courage and tolerance." Contestants came from all over Israel, they represented Muslim, Jewish, Christian, Bedouin, and Druze faiths, as well as Israeli, Arab, and Russian-Israeli ethnicities. The eleven contestants were:
 Talleen Abu Hanna
 Elian Nasiel
 Reem Or
 Aylin Ben Zaken
 Angelina Shamilov
 Danielle Larnon
 Maya Smadja
 Almog Yehuda
 Carolin Khoury
 Madlen Matar
 Shontal Israel

Winner 
Talleen Abu Hanna was crowned the winner of the pageant, breaking historical boundaries and becoming the first ever Miss Trans Israel. Abu Hanna is a ballet dancer, and a model, and now lives in Tel Aviv. After her victory at Miss Trans Israel, Abu Hanna went on to win second place in the Miss Trans Star Internacional Beauty Pageant 2016 which was held in Barcelona on September 17. She also appeared in the eighth season of the Israeli edition of Big Brother.

Celebration of the Trans Community 
For organizers, activists, contestants, and the LGBT community, the pageant was a celebration of acceptance in a region fraught with conflict and violence. Israel is arguably the only country in the Middle East where Trans people are free to live and express their true identities. Director, Israela Stephanie Lev was quoted in the Jerusalem Post saying: "We live in Israel, the only sane country in the region where people can live as gays or transgenders  and no one is going to throw them off the rooftop or slaughter them."

Miss Trans Israel 2017 
Elian Nesiel from Bat Yam is the winner of the beauty pageant Miss Trans Israel 2017, and she represented the nation of Israel in the Miss Trans Star International 2017 beauty contest, that was held in the city of Barcelona.

See also 
 Miss Trans Star Internacional
 Miss T World
 LGBT in the Middle East
 LGBT rights in Israel
 Tel Aviv Municipal LGBT Community Center
 Habima Theatre

References 

Transgender beauty pageants
Transgender events
Beauty pageants in Israel
Recurring events established in 2016
2016 establishments in Israel
LGBT events in Israel
Transgender in the Middle East